is a Shinto shrine located in Nakamura-cho, Nakamura-ku, Nagoya, central Japan. It was built to commemorate Toyotomi Hideyoshi, who hailed from the region.

External links 

 Official homepage

1885 establishments in Japan
Shinto shrines in Nagoya